Kanmani may refer to:
 Kanmani (album), a Malayalam-language album
 Kanmani (film), a Tamil-language film
 Kanmani (TV series), a 2018 Indian Tamil language village family soap opera
 Kanmani (director), a Tamil and Telugu film director